The M111 engine family is a straight-4 automobile engine from Mercedes-Benz, produced from 1992 to 2003. Debuted in the 1992 Mercedes-Benz E-Class (W124), this engine family is relatively oversquare and uses 4 valves per cylinder. All engines in the family use a cast iron engine block and aluminum alloy cylinder head.

M111.920 and M111.921 
The M111.920 is a  16 valve engine with bore and stroke of 85.3 mm × 78.7 mm. Starting with 1996 it has a variant called the M111.921 which has a MAF (Mass Air Flow)-sensor instead of MAP-sensor on the first one, and using ECU instead of PMS. 

Applications:
 1993-2000 C180 (W202)

M111.940 

Applications:
 1992-1995 E200 (W124)
 1997-2002 CLK200 (C208)
 1993-2000 C200 (W202)

Unlike the 102, 103, and early 104 series engines, the engine did not use mechanical fuel injection but the Siemens PEC/PMS (Pressure Engine Control) management system, which integrates fuel and spark management.

It is a speed-density type of system, as mixture formation is dependent on RPM, TPS angle, and manifold pressure (MAP).

Injectors work in pairs (idle, part load), or altogether (full-load).

It uses 2 ignition coils and no ignition distributor. Cylinders are fired in pairs (dual fire) - 1 and 4 together, and 2 and 3 together. The crankshaft position sensor is sensing the movement of two radially opposed position plates on the flywheel, one of which is magnetized, and the other is not. Thus, the engine management has precise information which group of cylinders to fire, and which group of injectors to spray.

M111.942 
Similar to the M111.940 engine, used in the following years.

Applications:
 1995-2000 E200 (W210)
 1993-2000 C200 (W202)

This motor never had PMS. Early models -95 to -97 has a HFM-motronic, hot-film type air/fuel metering device,  and -97 to -2002 with ME2.1 motronic. The later system also has a magnet on the intake camshaft, and gives signal to ECU, to assist the motor in producing more torque at low revs. The early motor didn't have any camshaft position sensor, so wiring was much different.

The only problem experienced with this M111 excellent reliability motor is the originally installed Victor Reinz headgasket, which eventually tore apart by age, and made the top lose coolant on the side. Other than that, only some year models, had bad insulation on the engine wiring, that needed all the wiring to be replaced.

M111.943 

Applications:

 1996-2000 SLK200 Kompressor (R170)

M111.944 
The M111.944 is a  16-valve engine utilizing a supercharger similar to the 2.3L M111.973 engine. This engine was built especially for SLK 170 and CLK 208 exported to Italy, The Netherlands, Portugal and Greece for tax reasons. The 'executive cars' tax limit was based in engine's capacity bigger than 2000 cc, so Mercedes in order to hit these markets made a mixture of the M111.940 with the supercharger of M111.973 for high performance at low engine capacity.

Applications:
 1996-1999 C200 Kompressor (W202)

M111.945 

Applications:
 1998-2000  C200 (W202)

M111.946 

Applications:
 1996-2000 SLK200 (R170)

M111.947 

Applications:
 1997-2002 E200 Kompressor (W210)

M111.951 / M111.952 
EVO engine (M 111 E 20 EVO). Naturally aspirated, compression ratio is 10.6:1. Improvement includes reinforced cylinder block, new cylinder head, individual coil-on-plug ignition with new iridium-tipped spark plugs for 100,000km/60,000 mile replacement intervals, connecting rods and pistons for higher compression ratio, fuel injection now Siemens SIM4, EuroIV emissions compliant, dual oxygen sensors. 

Applications:
 2000-2002 Mercedes-Benz C Class C180 (W203)
 2000-2003 V200/Vito 113

A M111.952 variant of this engine was fitted to the final model year S202 where it replaced the older 1.8l 122hp version for MY 2001. 2295 built from 06.2000 until 1.2001.

M111.955 
This is a 2.0L Kompressor engine utilizing a supercharger and produces  of power. It has 4 cylinders with 16 valves.

Applications:
 2000-2002 Mercedes-Benz C Class (W203) Kompressor
 2001 Mercedes-Benz SportCoupe (CL203) Kompressor
 2001 Mercedes-Benz SLK-200K  (R170)  Kompressor

M111.957 

Applications:
 2000-2002 E200K

M111.958 

Applications:

 2000-2004 SLK200 Kompressor (R170)

M111.960 / M111.961 

Applications:
 1992-1995 E220
1994 - 1996 C220

M111.970 and M111.974 

Applications:
 1995-1997 E230
 1997-1998 C230
 1996-2003 V230/Vito 114
1996-2004 MB100 2.3
2005-2013 Ssangyong Actyon 4 cylinder.
1997-2014 Ssangyong Chairman 4 cylinder.
1996-2004 Ssangyong Istana / Daewoo Istana 4 cylinder.
 1993-2003 Ssangyong Korando 4 cylinder.
 2005-2014 Ssangyong Kyron 4 cylinder.
1993-2003 Ssangyong Musso 4 cylinder.
2001-2012 Ssangyong Rexton 4 cylinder.

M111.973 

Applications:

 1996-2000 SLK230 Kompressor (R170)

M111.975 

Applications:
 1999 E200 Kompressor
 1997-2002 CLK230 Kompressor (C208)
 1999-2002 C230 Kompressor (W202)
 1998-2004 SLK230 Kompressor

M111.981 
Similar to the 2.3L M111.974 engine, except supercharged. 

Power .

Applications:
 2002 C230 Kompressor

M111.983 

Applications:

 2000-2004 SLK230 Kompressor (R170)

M111.984 
Power .

Applications:
 1995-2006 Sprinter 214 / 314 / 414
 1996-2001 Volkswagen LT 2.3
 1996-1998 Ssangyong Musso 2.3

See also
 List of Mercedes-Benz engines

References

 Mercedes Benz E-Class - from Mercedes Club.cz (Czech Republic)

M111
Straight-four engines
Gasoline engines by model